The Hyperion Water Reclamation Plant is a sewage treatment plant in southwest Los Angeles, California, next to Dockweiler State Beach on Santa Monica Bay. The plant is the largest sewage treatment facility in the Los Angeles Metropolitan Area and one of the largest plants in the world. Hyperion is operated by the City of Los Angeles, Department of Public Works, and the Bureau of Sanitation. Hyperion is the largest sewage plant by volume west of the Mississippi River.

Los Angeles City Sanitation (LASAN) operates the largest wastewater collection system in the US, serving a population of four million within a  service area.

The city's wastewater system - sewers and treatment plants - operates 24 hours a day, 365 days a year to serve the needs of more than four million customers in Los Angeles, plus 29 contracting cities and agencies. There are ongoing construction projects to ensure service remains available to all of the residents in the City of Los Angeles.

History
Until 1925, raw sewage from Los Angeles was discharged untreated directly into Santa Monica Bay in the region of today's Hyperion Treatment Plant.

With the population increase, the amount of sewage became a major problem to the beaches, so in 1925 the city built a simple screening plant in the  it had acquired in 1892.

Even with the screening plant, the quality of the water in Santa Monica Bay was unacceptable, and in 1950 Los Angeles opened the Hyperion Treatment Plant with full secondary treatment processes. In addition, the new plant included capture of biogas from anaerobic digesters to produce heat dried fertilizer.

In order to keep up with the increase of influent wastewater produced by the ever-growing city of Los Angeles, by 1957 the plant engineers had cut back treatment levels and increased the discharge of a blend of primary and secondary effluent through a  pipe into the ocean. They also opted to halt the production of fertilizers and started discharging digested sludge into the Santa Monica Bay through a  pipe.

Samples of the ocean floor where sludge had been discharged for 30 years demonstrated that the only living creatures were worms and a hardy species of clam. Additionally, coastal monitoring revealed that bay waters often did not meet quality standards as the result of Hyperion's effluent. These issues resulted in the city entering into a consent decree with the United States Environmental Protection Agency and the California State Water Resources Control Board to build significant facility upgrades at Hyperion. In 1980, the city launched a massive "sludge-out" project that upgraded the plant to full secondary treatment. Sludge digesters are used to destroy the disease-causing organisms (pathogens). The sludge-out portion of the program was completed in 1987.

Reclaimed water 
Treating this much water on a daily basis takes a lot of energy. The plant has cut costs with its own power plant that uses methane gas gathered from the waste to fuel the plant, saving money. Some of the wastewater is used for landscape irrigation, industrial processes, and groundwater replenishment.

Environmental controversies 
 
Heal the Bay was founded in 1985 as a result of what was being done at Hyperion. Heal the Bay's original goal was to keep neighboring ocean water near the plant clean. At the time Hyperion was dumping used syringes, condoms, and tampons. Consequently, these products were going into the ocean through a pipeline having harmful effects on the ocean's ecosystem, people visiting the beach, and surfers. It took two years to have Hyperion accountable for their actions, and it took 12 years, along with $12.6 billion, to have Hyperion discharge clean water into the Santa Monica Bay. After this large-scale overhaul of the plant, Hyperion was up to the California regulations that were put in place in 1985.

Heal the Bay provided information to the public in 2017 when Hyperion was undergoing maintenance work on a  pipeline that goes into the ocean. During this time the plant used its emergency pipeline. This had negative impacts on local beaches such as a rise in chlorine and bacteria levels for two months.

In popular culture
Because of its hyper-industrial appearance and its location within the  "studio zone", the Hyperion plant has been used numerous times as a location for feature films and television shows, among them Battle for the Planet of the Apes and The Terminator.

References

Further reading
 Horenstein, B., Hernandez, G., Raspberry, G., Crosse, J. (1990) "Successful dewatering experience at Hyperion wastewater treatment plant", Water Science and Technology, v. 22, p. 183-191
 Jones-Lepp, T. and Stevens, R. (2007) "Pharmaceuticals and personal care products in biosolids/sewage sludge: the interface between analytical chemistry and regulation", Analytical & Bioanalytical Chemistry, v. 387, p. 1173–1183

External links
 West Basin Municipal Water District Urban Water Management Plan (2010)
 Hyperion Honored as One of APWA's Top 10 Public Works Projects of the Century

Sewage treatment plants in California
South Bay, Los Angeles
Environment of Greater Los Angeles
Government of Los Angeles
Government buildings in Los Angeles
1950 establishments in California
Government buildings completed in 1950
Infrastructure completed in 1950
Power stations in California